Abbi Jacobson is an American comedian, writer, actress, illustrator and producer. She co-created and co-starred in the Comedy Central series Broad City (2014–2019) with Ilana Glazer, based on the web series of the same name. Her other roles include voicing Katie Mitchell in The Mitchells vs. the Machines (2021), Nya in The Lego Ninjago Movie (2017), and Princess Bean in the series Disenchantment (2018–present), in addition to appearing in the live-action films Person to Person (2017) and 6 Balloons (2018). She is a writer and co-creator of the Amazon Prime series A League of Their Own (2022), in which she also stars as Carson Shaw, a baseball player in the All-American Girls Professional Baseball League.

Early life 
Abbi Jacobson is the daughter of Susan Komm, an artist, and Alan Jacobson, a graphic designer. She is Jewish. She was raised in Wayne, Pennsylvania, where she attended Valley Forge Middle School and Conestoga High School.

She studied fine arts and video production at the Maryland Institute College of Art (MICA), graduating in 2006 with a B.F.A. in General Fine Arts. While at MICA, she studied stand-up comedy for one year with poet Jeremy Sigler, having transferred for a term to study acting at Emerson College.

Jacobson moved to New York City after graduating from MICA. She began taking classes with the Atlantic Theater Company and the Upright Citizens Brigade Theatre, where she met Ilana Glazer.

Career

Broad City 
From 2009 to 2011, Jacobson and Glazer wrote and performed in a web series titled Broad City, which focused on their lives in New York. The series was nominated for an ECNY Award for Best Web Series. It was well received by critics and developed a cult following. At the Upright Citizens Brigade, Jacobson and Glazer adapted the series into a live show that they performed in, called Broad City Live.

In 2011, cable network FX, working with Amy Poehler as the producer, purchased a script commitment for the series from Glazer and Jacobson. However, the network did not approve the script and decided not to proceed with development. Glazer and Jacobson then approached Comedy Central, who agreed to purchase the script from FX and order a pilot.

Broad City made its broadcast television premiere in January 2014 and was received with positive reviews and strong ratings, becoming Comedy Central's highest-rated first season since 2012 among the younger demographics, including adults 18–34, with an average of 1.2 million viewers.

The show has received critical acclaim from fans and critics alike. Review aggregation website Metacritic noted season 1 received "generally favorable reviews", giving it a score of 75 out of 100, based on reviews from 14 critics. Karen Valby from Entertainment Weekly described the show as a "deeply weird, weirdly sweet, and completely hilarious comedy". The Wall Street Journal referred to the show as "Sneak Attack Feminism". Critic Megan Angelo quotes Abbi Jacobson: "If you watch one of our episodes, there's not a big message, but if you watch all of them, I think, they're empowering to women." The A.V. Club critic Caroline Framke wrote that Broad City was "worth watching" despite its "well-trod premise", and that the series is "remarkably self-possessed, even in its first episode". Jacobson was a fan of bands like Phish growing up and would often spoof her jamband fandom on Broad City.

Season one of the show received a 96% "Certified Fresh" rating from Rotten Tomatoes, based on reviews from 23 critics, with the site's consensus stating, "From its talented producers to its clever writing and superb leads, Broad City boasts an uncommonly fine pedigree." The A.V. Club named Broad City the second best TV show of 2014 for its first season.

In February 2014, Comedy Central renewed the show for a second season. Season two received positive reviews, with Metacritic giving it a score of 89 out of 100, based on reviews from 8 critics, indicating "universal acclaim". Rotten Tomatoes gave the second season a rating of 100%, based on reviews from 11 critics, with the site's consensus: "Led by two of the funniest women on TV, Broad City uses its stars' vibrant chemistry to lend an element of authenticity to the show's chaotic yet enlightening brand of comedy."

In January 2015, the series was then renewed for a third season, which premiered on February 17, 2016. In January 2016, the series was renewed for a fourth and a final, fifth season.

Other work 
In 2011, Jacobson wrote and performed in a solo show called Welcome to Camp, which ran in New York and Los Angeles.

In December 2015, Jacobson was cast in the film Person to Person, opposite Michael Cera and Phillip Baker Hall, written and directed by Dustin Guy Defa. Jacobson also starred in The Lego Ninjago Movie, released on September 22, 2017.

Her first appearance in BoJack Horseman was in the 2016 episode "The Bojack Horseman Show", in which she voiced Emily.

In 2017, Jacobson hosted a 10-episode podcast about modern and contemporary art called A Piece of Work co-produced by The Museum of Modern Art and WNYC Studios. She plans to do a second season.

Since 2018, she has voiced Princess Bean in Matt Groening's Disenchantment.

Jacobson appeared in a March 2020 episode of Curb Your Enthusiasm.

In 2021, Jacobson voiced Katie Mitchell in the Sony Pictures Animation film The Mitchells vs. the Machines.

In 2022 she served as a writer, producer, co-creator and star of the Amazon series A League of Their Own, based on the 1992 film of the same name, where she plays catcher Carson Shaw.

Books 
In 2013, Jacobson published two coloring books with Chronicle Books: Color This Book: New York City and Color This Book: San Francisco. Jacobson also illustrated a book titled Carry This Book, published October 2016 by Viking Press. It features colorful, humorous illustrations of the imagined contents of various celebrities' bags. "I have always been intrigued by what people carry around with them. It can tell you everything" says Jacobson in the book's introduction. Well received by critics, Carry This Book was a New York Times bestseller.

Jacobson published another book, I Might Regret This: Essays, Drawings, Vulnerabilities, and Other Stuff. The book was published on October 30, 2018, with Grand Central Publishing. With drawings throughout, the book of personal essays is centered around Jacobson's solo three week cross-country road trip. The 320 pages of personal essays and various short stories, although some are comical in nature, largely focus on Jacobson getting over her first love, first relationship with a woman, and general issues of identity. According to Jacobson, the book is centered around self-reflection: "It's about how I've felt like an internal outsider for my entire life because I just never understood what love was, that I would never get to experience it, and being a public figure only heightened that anxiety."

Personal life 
In an April 2018 interview, Jacobson stated that she dates men and women but "they have to be funny, doing something they love".

She has been in a relationship with Jodi Balfour since October 2020. As of August 2022, Jacobson and Balfour are engaged.

Filmography

Film

Television

References

External links 

 A Piece of Work podcast WNYC Studios
 A Piece of Work podcast The Museum of Modern Art
 Broad City on Comedy Central
 
 

Living people
21st-century American actresses
Actresses from Philadelphia
American stand-up comedians
American women comedians
Annie Award winners
Jewish American actresses
Jewish American writers
Jewish American female comedians
Maryland Institute College of Art alumni
People from Radnor Township, Pennsylvania
American women television writers
Writers from Philadelphia
Upright Citizens Brigade Theater performers
American film actresses
American television actresses
American voice actresses
American women podcasters
American podcasters
Comedians from Pennsylvania
Bisexual actresses
Emerson College alumni
LGBT producers
Bisexual Jews
Bisexual comedians
LGBT people from Pennsylvania
21st-century American comedians
21st-century American screenwriters
21st-century American women writers
21st-century American Jews
21st-century LGBT people
American bisexual actors
Year of birth missing (living people)
American LGBT comedians
American bisexual writers